The 1871 Melbourne Cup was a two-mile handicap horse race which took place on Thursday, 9 November 1871.

This year was the eleventh running of the Melbourne Cup. It was the third Melbourne Cup win for owner and trainer John Tait.

This is the list of placegetters for the 1871 Melbourne Cup.

See also

 Melbourne Cup
 List of Melbourne Cup winners
 Victoria Racing Club

References

External links
1871 Melbourne Cup footyjumpers.com

1871
Melbourne Cup
Melbourne Cup
19th century in Melbourne
1870s in Melbourne